Viola Patricia Amherd (born 7 June 1962) is a Swiss politician who has served as a Member of the Swiss Federal Council since 2019. She is the head of the Federal Department of Defence, Civil Protection and Sport. Amherd was a member of the Christian Democratic People's Party (CVP/PDC) until 2021, when it merged with the Conservative Democratic Party (BDP/PBD) to form The Centre (DM/LC), which she joined.

Biography

Political career
Amherd was a member of the city council of Brig-Glis (Stadtrat, executive member) from 1992 to 1996, vice president of the municipality of Brig-Glis from 1996 to 2000 and president of the municipality of Brig-Glis from 2000 to 2012. Representing the canton of Valais, she was member of the Swiss National Council from 31 May 2005 to 31 December 2018. In the election for the Federal Council of 9 December 2015, Amherd received 16 votes for the vacant seat held by Eveline Widmer-Schlumpf until the following 31 December, although she had not put her name forward as a candidate. The seat eventually went to Guy Parmelin.

In the course of speculations about a candidature for the Federal Council, she announced her candidacy for the replacement of Doris Leuthard on 5 October 2018. On 16 November 2018, Amherd and Heidi Z'graggen, a local executive in the canton of Uri, were nominated as Federal Council candidates by the CVP/PDC. The following 5 December, she was elected to the Federal Council with 148 voting in the first ballot alongside Karin Keller-Sutter of FDP.The Liberals.

On 10 December 2018, it was announced that Amherd would head the Federal Department of Defence, Civil Protection and Sport (DDPS) from 1 January 2019. Amherd became the first woman to hold the position.

Following the 2022 Russian invasion of Ukraine, in April 2022 Amherd wrote to International Olympic Committee President Thomas Bach, urging the IOC to suspend officials from Russia and Belarus, much as the IOC recommended a ban of athletes and officials from both countries from competitions.

Personal life
Amherd graduated from the Latin Grammar School at the College in Brig in 1982. From 1982 to 1987, she studied jurisprudence at the University of Fribourg and in 1987 received a licenciate in both laws. She then completed an internship as a lawyer and notary in Brig-Glis until 1990. In 1990 she was awarded the notary's diploma of the canton of Valais and in 1991 the lawyer's diploma and the bar exam of the canton of Valais. Since 1991, she has worked as a self-employed lawyer and notary with an office in Brig-Glis and from 1994 to 2006 as a part-time judge of the Federal Personnel Appeals Commission. Viola Amherd is single and lives in Brig-Glis.

On 7 December 2022, she was elected Vice-President of the Federal Council for 2023; as is customary, she is expected to be elected President for 2024.

References

External links 

  
 

|-

|-

1962 births
20th-century  Swiss lawyers
21st-century  Swiss lawyers
20th-century Swiss women politicians
20th-century Swiss politicians
21st-century Swiss women politicians
21st-century Swiss politicians
Christian Democratic People's Party of Switzerland politicians
Canton of Valais politicians
Female defence ministers
Living people
Members of the National Council (Switzerland)
Members of the Federal Council (Switzerland)
People from Brig-Glis
Swiss Roman Catholics
Swiss women lawyers
University of Fribourg alumni
Women members of the National Council (Switzerland)
Women members of the Federal Council (Switzerland)
20th-century women lawyers
21st-century women lawyers
The Centre politicians